WPOL (1340 AM) is a commercial radio station broadcasting a Gospel music radio format. Licensed to Winston-Salem, North Carolina, the station is owned by Truth Broadcasting Corporation. In Winston-Salem and nearby communities, WPOL can also be heard on an FM translator at 103.5 MHz, for listeners who prefer FM radio. It is also simulcast on sister station 1400 kHz WKEW in Greensboro, North Carolina.  WPOL competes its triad coverage in High Point, North Carolina on 102.5 MHz.

WPOL runs the Get Up! Mornings with Erica Campbell nationally syndicated morning show as well as other syndicated and local gospel and religious shows aimed at the African-American community.

History
WAIR first signed on the air on March 25, 1937.

In the 1970s, WAIR aired an Urban contemporary format.  In March 1985, WAIR was a simulcast of Top 40 WSEZ at 93.1 FM (now WPAW) one-third of the time, though a billboard on Interstate 40 suggested WSEZ was broadcasting both on 1340 and 93.1. Later it was three-fourths urban and one-fourth a simulcast of album rock on WSEZ.

The WKEW simulcast began at the end of 2000.

Translators
In addition to the main station, WPOL is relayed by an FM translator to widen its broadcast area in the triad.

References

External links

FCC History Cards for WPOL

POL
Radio stations established in 1970
Gospel radio stations in the United States
1970 establishments in North Carolina
POL